Tia-Jade Primmer (born 2 May 2004) is an English professional footballer who plays as a midfielder for FA WSL club Reading.

Club career 
Primmer made her debut for Reading on 7 November 2021, against Birmingham City in the FA Women's Super League. On 30 January 2022, Primmer scored her first goal for Reading, the winner in their 3–2 victory over Brighton & Hove Albion in the Women's FA Cup. A week later, 6 February 2022, Primmer scored her first FA Women's Super League goal, scoring an 87th-minute winner for Reading against Everton.

On 7 July 2022, Primmer signed her first professional contract with Reading, until the summer of 2024.

Career statistics

Club

References

External links 
 

Living people
Reading F.C. Women players
English women's footballers
Women's association football midfielders
2004 births